Hannah Szenes (often anglicized as Hannah Senesh or Chanah Senesh; ; ; 17 July 19217 November 1944) was a poet and a Special Operations Executive (SOE) member. She was one of 37 Jewish SOE recruits from Mandate Palestine parachuted by the British into Yugoslavia during the Second World War to assist anti-Nazi forces and ultimately in the rescue of Hungarian Jews about to be deported to the German death camp at Auschwitz.

Szenes was arrested at the Hungarian border by Hungarian gendarmes. She was imprisoned and tortured, but refused to reveal details of her mission. She was eventually tried and executed by firing squad. She is regarded as a national heroine in Israel but has largely been forgotten in her birthplace of Hungary according to The Guardian. In Israel her poetry is widely known and the Yad Hana kibbutz, as well as several streets, are named after her.

Early life 

Szenes was born on July 17, 1921, to an assimilated Jewish family in Hungary. Her father, Béla, a journalist and playwright, died when she was six years old. She continued to live with her mother, Kathrine, and her brother, György.

She enrolled in a Protestant private school for girls that also accepted Catholic and Jewish pupils; however those of the Catholic and Jewish faiths had to pay double and three times the amount Protestants paid. After her mother thought it was too expensive, Szenes was declared a "gifted student" and allowed to only pay double the usual amount. This, along with the realization that the situation of the Jews in Hungary was becoming precarious, prompted Szenes to embrace Zionism, and she joined Maccabea, a Hungarian Zionist students organization.

Immigration to Nahalal
Szenes graduated in 1939 and decided to emigrate to the British Mandate of Palestine in order to study in the Girls' Agricultural School at Nahalal. In 1941, she joined Kibbutz Sdot Yam and then joined the Haganah, the paramilitary group that laid the foundation of the Israel Defense Forces.

Joseph G. Weiss, a scholar of Jewish mysticism, was in love with her. Parts of their correspondence were published after his death.

In 1943, she enlisted in the British Women's Auxiliary Air Force as an Aircraftwoman 2nd Class. Later the same year, she was recruited into the Special Operations Executive (SOE) and was sent to Egypt for parachute training.

The parachutists’ mission
Between 1943 and 1944, the Jewish community in Palestine (Yishuv) decided to send Jewish parachutists behind enemy lines to assist both Allied forces and the Jews in occupied Europe. The mission was a cooperation between the Yishuv and British forces to create a Jewish commando unit within the British army. Szenes volunteered and was selected along with 32 others, out of 250 candidates, to be sent on active missions.

Arrest and torture
On March 14, 1944, she and two colleagues were parachuted into Yugoslavia and joined a partisan group. After landing, they learned the Germans had already occupied Hungary, so the men decided to call off the mission as too dangerous.

Szenes continued on and headed for the Hungarian border. At the border, she and her companions were arrested by Hungarian gendarmes, who found her British military transmitter, used to communicate with the SOE and other partisans. She was taken to a prison, stripped, tied to a chair, then whipped and clubbed for three days. She lost several teeth as a result of the beatings.

The guards wanted to know the code for her transmitter so they could find out who the parachutists were and trap others. Transferred to a Budapest prison, Szenes was repeatedly interrogated and tortured, but only revealed her name and refused to provide the transmitter code, even when her mother was also arrested. They threatened to kill her mother if she did not cooperate, but she refused.

Trial and execution
She was tried for treason in Hungary on 28 October 1944 by a court appointed by the fascist Arrow Cross regime. There was an eight-day postponement to give the judges more time to find a verdict, followed by another postponement, this one because of the appointment of a new Judge Advocate. She was executed by a firing squad on November 7, 1944.
She kept diary entries until her last day. One of them read: "In the month of July, I shall be twenty-three/I played a number in a game/The dice have rolled. I have lost," and another: "I loved the warm sunlight."

Her diary was published in Hebrew in 1946. Her remains were brought to Israel in 1950 and buried in the cemetery on Mount Herzl, Jerusalem. Her tombstone was brought to Israel in November 2007 and placed in Sdot Yam.

During the trial of Rudolf Kastner, who was a controversial figure involved in negotiating with the Nazis to save a number of Hungarian Jews during the Holocaust, Szenes's mother testified that during the time her daughter was imprisoned, Kastner's people had advised her not to obtain a lawyer for her daughter. Further, she recalled a conversation with Kastner after the war, telling him, "I don't say that you could have saved my daughter Hannah, but that you didn't try – it makes it harder for me that nothing was done."

After the Cold War, a Hungarian military court officially exonerated her. Her kin in Israel were informed on November 5, 1993.

Poetry, songs and plays
Szenes was a poet and playwright, writing both in Hungarian and Hebrew. The following are four of her better known poems. The best known of these is "A Walk to Caesarea", commonly known as Eli, Eli ("My God, My God"). The well-known melody was composed by David Zahavi.  Many singers have sung it, including Ofra Haza, Regina Spektor, and Sophie Milman. It was used to close some versions of the film Schindler's List.

Images

In popular culture

 The Legend of Hannah Senesh, a play about Szenes written by Aharon Megged, was produced and directed by Laurence Merrick at the Princess Theatre in Los Angeles in 1964. Szenes was played by Joan Huntington.
 Hanna's War, a film about Szenes's life directed by Menahem Golan, was released in 1988.  Szenes was portrayed by Maruschka Detmers.
 Blessed is the Match: The Life and Death of Hannah Senesh, directed by Roberta Grossman, is a documentary film that recounts the events of Szenes's life. It was released in 2008.
 Darkness (one two three), a musical pilot project of the Association of Global Art, led by the musician and singer , in which Szenes's last poem was composed and sung (English and Hebrew, 2019).

See also
 Jewish Parachutists of Mandate Palestine

References

Bibliography
 חנה סנש: חייה, שליחותה ומותה, in Hebrew. 1952.
 Diario, cartas, iniciación literaria, misión y muerte, memorias de la madre, 1966. in Spanish. 396 pages.
 Hannah Senesh, Her Life & Diary, Schocken Books, 1972.
 Masters, Anthony. The Summer That Bled; The Biography of Hannah Senesh. New York: St. Martin's Press, 1972. 
 Goldenberg, Linda. In Kindling Flame: The Story of Hannah Senesh, 1921-1944. New York: Lothrop, Lee & Shepard Books, 1985.  
 Hay, Peter.  Ordinary Heroes: Chana Szenes and the Dream of Zion.  G.P. Putnam's Sons, 1986.  
 Whitman, Ruth. The Testing of Hannah Senesh Detroit: Wayne State University Press, 1986. 
 Maxine Rose Schur, Hannah Szenes: A Song of Light, Philadelphia, 1986. 
 Betzer, Oded. The Paratrooper Who Didn't Return. World Zionist Organization, 1989.
 Ransom, Candice F.  So Young to Die: the Story of Hannah Senesh.  Scholastic, 1993.   
 Senesh, Hannah, and Marge Piercy (foreword). Hannah Senesh: Her Life and Diary. Jewish Lights Publishing, 2004.  
 Gozlan, Martine, Hannah Szenes, l'étoile foudroyée. Paris: Ed. de l'Archipel, 2014.   In French.
 Shalom, Avner, Hannah Senesh, ''Poems within the Depth, שירים מן המעמקים, The Association of Global Art Publishing House, Budapest and Caesarea 2018  in English and Hebrew, appendix A and B in Spanish and Lithuanian

Websites

External links 

 Video Lecture by Dr. Henry Abramson on Hannah Szenes
 Teacher's Study Guide 
 Hannah Senesh Legacy foundation
 Jewish Community Day School, Brooklyn, New York
 Blessed Is The Match, a documentary film about Hannah
 Blessed Is The Match at Women Make Movies
 Hannah Szenes Biography  at J-Grit: The Internet Index of Tough Jews
 Hannah Szenes: Poet, Hero, Martyr: Video lecture on Hannah Szenesh by Dr. Henry Abramson
 Hannah Szenes on Jewish.hu's list of famous Hungarian Jews
 Chana Szenes – The Match That Burns Forever
 Sophie Milman Version of Eli, Eli

Hungarian people of World War II
Hungarian Jews
Female resistance members of World War II
Jewish parachutists of Mandate Palestine
Women in World War II
Jewish poets
Women diarists
Kibbutzniks
Executed spies
Military personnel who died in the Holocaust
Jewish resistance members during the Holocaust
1921 births
1944 deaths
Burials at Mount Herzl
Torture victims
Spies who died in the Holocaust
Executed military personnel
20th-century women writers
20th-century poets
20th-century executions for treason
People executed by Hungary by firing squad
People executed for treason against Hungary
Overturned convictions
Women's Auxiliary Air Force airwomen
British Special Operations Executive personnel
Jewish women writers
Royal Air Force personnel killed in World War II
20th-century diarists
Hungarian emigrants to Mandatory Palestine
Special Operations Executive personnel killed in World War II